Richard Michael Pirrie (6 June 1920 – 6 June 1944) was an Australian rules footballer who played with Hawthorn in the Victorian Football League (VFL).

Family
The son of Richard Francis Pirrie (1879–1962), and Isobel Agatha Pirrie (1897–1982), née McGuire, Richard Michael Pirrie was born in Hawthorn on 6 June 1920.

Education
He attended St Patrick's College, East Melbourne.

Football
His father, also known as "Dick" Pirrie, and his brother, Kevin Pirrie also played for Hawthorn.

His nephew, Kevin's son Stephen Pirrie, played with Richmond, St Kilda and Essendon in the Victorian Football League (VFL), and with Port Melbourne in the VFA.

War service  
Following the outbreak of World War II, Pirrie enlisted in the Royal Australian Navy (RAN), on 8 September 1941 and was given the service number PM/V77. 

Acting Sub-Lieutenant Perrie was posted to Britain, for training in amphibious landings. He was assigned initially to Royal Navy shore establishment, HMS Quebec, which was a part of the British  Combined Operations Training Centre, on the banks of Loch Fyne, Scotland.

By mid-1944, Pirrie had been posted to a shore establishment on the River Hamble, Hampshire, HMS Cricket, where a component of the expeditionary force for the Allied invasion of North West Europe was being assembled.

On D-Day (6 June), he was attached to the crew of a British LSI HMS Invicta, which landed part of the 7th Canadian Infantry Brigade at "Juno Beach", near Courseulles-sur-Mer. Pirrie was killed when Invicta received a direct hit from a German shore battery. He was the first member of the RAN to be killed in action on D-Day. He was mentioned in dispatches (MiD): "For gallantry, skill and determination and undaunted devotion to duty during the initial landing of Allied Forces on the coast of Normandy".

See also
 List of Victorian Football League players who died in active service
 List of Australian rules football families

Footnotes

References
Holmesby, Russell & Main, Jim (2007). The Encyclopedia of AFL Footballers. 7th ed. Melbourne: Bas Publishing.

External links
 
 Dick Pirrie, australianfootball.com.

1920 births
1944 deaths
Australian rules footballers from Melbourne
Hawthorn Football Club players
Australian military personnel killed in World War II
Royal Australian Navy personnel of World War II
Australian Roman Catholics
Royal Australian Navy officers
People from Hawthorn, Victoria
Military personnel from Melbourne